Maples Inn may refer to:

Maples Inn (Pointe-Claire, Quebec), home of the first miniature golf course in Canada
The Maples Inn, also known as Hampton Inn (New Canaan, Connecticut)
Maples Inn, onetime name of N. S. Williams House, East Taunton, Massachusetts